is the Japanese martial art of using the Japanese weapon jitte (also known as jutte in English-language sources). Jittejutsu was evolved mainly for the law enforcement officers of the Edo period to enable non-lethal disarmament and apprehension of criminals who were usually carrying a sword. Besides the use of striking an assailant on the head, wrists, hands and arms like that of a baton, the jitte can also be used for blocking, deflecting and grappling a sword in the hands of a skilled user. 

There are several schools of jittejutsu today and various jitte influences and techniques are featured in several martial arts.

See also

Ikkaku-ryū juttejutsu, a school of jittejutsu featured exclusively in the martial arts school Shintō Musō-ryū

References 

Ko-ryū bujutsu
Japanese martial arts